or , also known as dance or dance-drama, is a type of kabuki play based on dance.

A central element of kabuki since its origin in 1603,  plays became an important part of the kabuki repertoire towards the end of the 17th century, and still forms a key part of the kabuki repertoire today. For example, the January 2018 program at the Kabuki-za in Tokyo included three  performances.

There are several types of kabuki dances. An important difference is between the mainly non-narrative dances with  accompaniment (such as ), and the more dramatic ones, with complex storylines and characters (such as ). The  musicians are often seated in rows on stepped platforms behind the dancers. There are many other distinctions and styles. For example,  dances include particularly theatricalized sets and costumes, often including quick on-stage changes of clothes (called ).  dances involve a single actor playing different roles.

History 
From the very origin of kabuki in 1603, when Izumo no Okuni began performing in the dry riverbeds of Kyoto - a style referred to as  - dance has been a central element of kabuki, and in fact those first performances involved more dance and music than drama.

"female role") actors, entered the kabuki repertoire in the Genroku period (1688-1704) (see also ). The form was further developed from the Kyoho to the Horeki period (1716–1764), and  became the main form of accompaniment.

The first actor to perfect the genre was Segawa Kikunojo I, considered an excellent dancer and the best  in Edo during the first half of the 18th century. He became very successful shortly after arriving to the city in 1730 by performing the leading role on the dance  at the Nakamura-za.

A native of Osaka, he achieved great success early in his career with performances of a  dance, particularly in Edo at the Nakamura-za in 1741 and then again in 1748. His greatest accomplishment was his performance of the main role in the debut of one of the most famous kabuki dances, in 1753, again at the Nakamura-za. The performance was so successful that it was staged for several months, and Tomijuro became one of the most famous actors in Edo.

References 
 

Kabuki
Japanese words and phrases